Cementerios is an underground metro station on Line 2 of the Santiago Metro, in Santiago, Chile. The word cementerios means "cemeteries" in English and the station is so named due to its surroundings of Recoleta Avenue that forms the borders of two cemeteries, the Santiago General Cemetery to the west and the smaller Catholic Cemetery to the east. The station was opened on November 25, 2005, as part of the extension of the line from Cerro Blanco to Einstein.

References

Santiago Metro stations
Santiago Metro Line 2